The 1907 Belfast North by-election was held on 17 April 1907.  The by-election was held due to the death of the incumbent Irish Unionist MP, Daniel Dixon.  It was won by the Irish Unionist candidate George Clark.  North Belfast had previously been a marginal seat with the Labour candidate, William Walker, coming within 500 votes of winning on the two previous occasions.  In order to win over Protestant votes, Walker made clear that he was opposed to Home Rule

External links 
A Vision Of Britain Through Time

References

Belfast North by-election
Belfast North by-election
North, 1907
20th century in Belfast
1907 elections in Ireland